Mohamed Guy William Baldé (born 4 April 1971),  known as William Baldé, is a singer-songwriter and composer born in Guinea. In 2008, he became famous with his album En corps étranger and his single "Rayon de soleil", number-one hit in France and Belgium.

Biography
William Baldé started his singing career with the afro soul band Yuba in which he sang in English. The group had a contract with EMI record company and released in 1995 a first album entitled Everybody Nyani. Well received in the showbiz, Yuba opened the concerts of Jamiroquai and The Eagles, among other artists.

The soloist career of William Baldé started in the late 2007, when he was first part of the concerts of Christophe Maé, singing in front of a large audience (over 400,000). In June 2008, he released his first album En corps étranger and the summer hit "Rayon de soleil" which was a smash hit in France and Belgium (Wallonia). This single was followed by the second one from this album, Sweet Lady.

Baldé is currently nominated for the 2009 NRJ Music Awards in the category 'French revelation of the year'.

Discography

Albums

Singles

References

External links
 Official site

English-language singers from France
French singer-songwriters
Living people
Guinean emigrants to France
1971 births
21st-century French singers
21st-century French male singers
French male singer-songwriters